The Katiki Formation is a Late Cretaceous (Campanian to Maastrichtian, or Haumurian in the regional stratigraphy) geologic formation of the South Island of New Zealand. Plesiosaur remains of Kaiwhekea katiki, named after the formation, are among the fossils that have been recovered from the deltaic siltstones.

Description 
The Katiki Formation overlies more proximal marine sandstones of the Herbert Formation and, below that, non-marine quartzose sandy to pebbly coal measures of the Shag Point Group.

Fossil content 
 Belemnites
 Dimitobelus (Dimitocamax) hectori
 Reptiles
 Mosasauridae indet.
 Elasmosauridae
 Kaiwhekea katiki
 Dinophyceae
 Gonyaulacaceae
 Cribroperidinium edwardsii
 Peridiniaceae
 Chatangiella campbellensis
 Palaeocystodinium granulatum

See also 
 Plesiosaur stratigraphic distribution
 South Polar region of the Cretaceous
 Conway Formation
 Tahora Formation

References

Bibliography 
 

Geologic formations of New Zealand
Cretaceous System of Oceania
Campanian Stage
Maastrichtian Stage
Siltstone formations
Deltaic deposits
Paleontology in New Zealand